Charles Michael Schwab (February 18, 1862 – September 18, 1939) was an American steel magnate.  Under his leadership, Bethlehem Steel became the second-largest steel maker in the United States, and one of the most important heavy manufacturers in the world.

Early life
Charles M. Schwab was born in Williamsburg, Pennsylvania on February 18, 1862, the son of Pauline (née Farabaugh) and John Anthony Schwab. All four of his grandparents were Roman Catholic immigrants from Germany. Schwab was raised in Loretto, Pennsylvania, which he considered his hometown. His father, John, operated a livery stable in Loretto and also served as a mail-carrier. Schwab graduated from Saint Francis University in Loretto in 1877.

Career

Schwab began his career as an engineer in Andrew Carnegie's steelworks, starting as a stake-driver in the engineering corps of the Edgar Thomson Steel Works and Furnaces in Braddock, Pennsylvania. He was promoted often, including to the positions of general superintendent of Homestead Works in 1887, and general superintendent of the Edgar Thomson Steel Works in 1890. In 1897, at only 35 years of age, he became president of the Carnegie Steel Company. In 1901, he helped negotiate the secret sale of Carnegie Steel to a group of New York–based financiers led by J. P. Morgan. After the buyout, Schwab became the first president of the United States Steel Corporation, the company formed out of Carnegie's former holdings. 

After several clashes with Morgan and fellow US Steel executive Elbert Gary, Schwab left USS in 1903 to run the Bethlehem Shipbuilding and Steel Company in Bethlehem, Pennsylvania. The company had gained shipyards in California, Delaware, and New Jersey through its brief but fortunate involvement as one of the few solvent enterprises in United States Shipbuilding Company. Under his leadership (and that of Eugene Grace), it became the largest independent steel producer in the world. A major part of Bethlehem Steel's success was the development of the H-beam, a precursor of today's ubiquitous I-beam. Schwab was interested in mass-producing the wide flange steel beam, but that was a risky venture that required raising capital and building a large new plant, all to make a product whose ability to sell was unproven. In his most famous remark, Schwab told his secretary, "I've thought the whole thing over, and if we are going bust, we will go bust big."

In 1908, Bethlehem Steel began making the beam, which revolutionized building construction and contributed to the age of the skyscraper. Its success helped make Bethlehem Steel the second-largest steel company in the world. Bethlehem, Pennsylvania, was incorporated, virtually as a company town, by uniting four previous villages. In 1910, Schwab broke the Bethlehem Steel strike by calling out the newly formed Pennsylvania State Police. Schwab successfully kept labor unions out of Bethlehem Steel throughout his tenure, although Bethlehem Steel unionized in 1941, two years after his death. 

In 1911, Bethlehem Steel formed a company soccer team known as Bethlehem Steel F.C. In 1914 Schwab took the team professional.  Until its demise in 1930, the team won eight league championships, six American Cups and five National Challenge Cups. It was considered among the greatest soccer teams in U.S. history. The company disbanded the team as a result of financial losses incurred during the internecine 1928–1929 "Soccer Wars" between American Soccer League and United States Football Association and the onset of the Great Depression in 1929.

During the first years of World War I, Bethlehem Steel had a virtual monopoly in contracts to supply the Allies with certain kinds of munitions. Schwab made many visits to Europe in connection with the manufacture and supply of munitions to the Allied governments, during this period. He circumvented American neutrality laws by funneling goods through Canada.

On April 16, 1918, Schwab became director general of Emergency Fleet Corporation, a board granted by Congress with master authority over all shipbuilding in the United States. He was appointed over Charles Piez, the former general manager of the corporation. President Wilson had specifically asked Schwab to assume this responsibility. Schwab's biggest change to the shipbuilding effort was to abandon the cost plus profit contracting system that had been in place up to that time and begin issuing fixed-price contracts. After America's entry into the war, he was accused of profiteering but was later acquitted.

Schwab was considered to be a risk taker and was highly controversial; Thomas Edison once famously called him the "master hustler". Schwab's lucrative contract providing steel to the Trans-Siberian Railroad came after he provided a $200,000 "gift" to the mistress of the Grand Duke Alexis Aleksandrovich. 

His innovative ways of dealing with his staff are given a mention in Dale Carnegie's most famous work, How to Win Friends and Influence People (1936). In 1928, Schwab was awarded the Bessemer Gold Medal for "outstanding services to the steel industry". In 1932, he was awarded the Melchett Medal by the British Institute of Fuel  In 1982, Schwab was inducted into the Junior Achievement U.S. Business Hall of Fame. In 2011, Schwab was inducted into the inaugural class of the American Metal Market Hall of Fame for his lifelong work in the U.S. steel industry.

Personal life

Schwab married Emma Eurana Dinkey (1859–1939) on May 1, 1883. Mrs. Schwab had lived in Weatherly, Pennsylvania, and donated $85,000 to build a school there.

Schwab eventually became very wealthy. He moved to New York City's Upper West Side, which at the time was considered the "wrong" side of Central Park, where he built "Riverside", the most ambitious private house ever built in New York. The $7 million 75-room house, designed by French architect Maurice Hebert, combined details from three French chateaux on a full city block. After Schwab's death, Mayor Fiorello La Guardia turned down a proposal to make Riverside the official mayoral residence, deeming it too grandiose. It was eventually razed and replaced by an apartment block.

Schwab also owned a 44-room summer estate on 1,000 acres (4 km2) in Loretto, Pennsylvania, called "" (German for 'evergreen'). The house featured opulent gardens and a nine-hole golf course. Rather than raze the existing house, Schwab had the mansion moved  on rollers to a new location to make room for the new mansion. Schwab's estate sold Immergrün after his death, and it is now Mount Assisi Friary owned by the Franciscan friars (Third Order Regular) who administer the adjacent Saint Francis University. The golf course, now known as “Immergrun Golf Club”, designed in 1917 by Donald Ross, is owned and operated by the university.

The gardens feature a cascading fountain modeled after features at Versailles and include sculptures by Paul Manship, known for the Prometheus sculpture at Rockefeller Center NYC.  

Schwab became notorious for his "fast lane" lifestyle including opulent parties, high-stakes gambling, and a string of extramarital affairs producing at least one child out of wedlock. The affairs and the out-of-wedlock child soured his relationship with his wife. He became an international celebrity when he "broke the bank" at Monte Carlo, and traveled in a $100,000 private rail car named "Loretto". Even before the Great Depression, he had already spent most of his fortune, estimated at between $25 million and $40 million. Adjusted for inflation in the first decade of the 21st century, that equates to between $500 million and $800 million.

The stock market crash of 1929 finished off what years of wanton spending had started. He spent his last years in a small apartment. He could no longer afford the taxes on "Riverside", and it was seized by creditors. He had offered to sell the mansion at a huge loss but there were no buyers. At his death ten years later, Schwab's holdings in Bethlehem Steel were virtually worthless, and he was over $300,000 in debt. Had he lived a few more years, he would have seen his fortunes restored when Bethlehem Steel was flooded with orders for war materiel. Schwab had no children by Eurana Dinkey, but had one daughter by a mistress.

A bust-length portrait of Schwab painted in 1903 by Swiss-born American artist Adolfo Müller-Ury (1862–1947) was formerly in the Jessica Dragonette Collection at the American Heritage Center at the University of Wyoming at Laramie, but has been donated to the National Portrait Gallery in Washington, D.C. Müller-Ury also painted his nephew and namesake Charles M. Schwab (son of his brother Joseph) as a boy in a sailor suit around the same date.

Death
Schwab's wife died on January 12, 1939. Schwab died on September 18 of that year of heart disease at his apartment on Park Avenue in New York City. His funeral was held at St. Patrick's Cathedral and about 2,000 people were estimated to line the streets of the procession. Al Smith, John D. Rockefeller Jr., and Charles Evans Hughes were in attendance at his funeral. He was originally interred at the Gate of Heaven Cemetery in Hawthorne, New York but his remains were moved on April 29, 1940 to a private mausoleum at the Saint Michael Catholic Church Cemetery in Loretto, Pennsylvania.

See also
 List of covers of Time magazine (1920s): November 22, 1926

References

Further reading
 James H. Bridge, 1903. The Inside History of the Carnegie Steel Company.
 Arundel Cotter, 1916. The Story of Bethlehem Steel.
 Arundel Cotter, 1921. United States Steel: A Corporation with a Soul.
 Burton W. Folsom, Jr., The Myth of the Robber Barons. Young America.
 Louis M. Hacker, 1968. The World of Andrew Carnegie.
 Burton J. Hendrick, 1969. The Life of Andrew Carnegie, 2 vols. 1st ed., 1932.
 Hessen, Robert, 1990. Steel titan: the life of Charles M. Schwab, Pittsburgh, Pa.: University of Pittsburgh Press.
 Hessen, Robert. (1971) "The Admiralty's American Ally" History Today. December 1971, Vol. 21 Issue 12, p864-869; sales to Britain in World War I
 Stewart H. Holbrook, 1953. Age of the Moguls.
 Ida M. Tarbell, 1925. The Life of Elbert H. Gary.
 Joseph Frazier Wall, 1970. Andrew Carnegie.

External links

 
 Charles M. Schwab.  Biography at Explore Pennsylvania History (archived).
 Schwab biography at the Bethlehem website
 Beyond Steel: An Archive of Lehigh Valley Industry and Culture
 Loretto Railcar Restoration
 Charles M. Schwab Correspondence, Finding Aid for Correspondence Collection, 1891, AIS.1994.02, Archives Services Center, University of Pittsburgh.
 

1862 births
1939 deaths
American industrialists
American steel industry businesspeople
American soccer chairmen and investors
Presidents of the American Society of Mechanical Engineers
American people of German descent
Saint Francis University alumni
Bethlehem Steel people
U.S. Steel people
19th-century American businesspeople
20th-century American businesspeople
Engineers from Pennsylvania
People from Bethlehem, Pennsylvania
People from Cambria County, Pennsylvania
People from the Upper West Side